Anna Ginsburg is a British film director working with a range of techniques and mediums, including traditional hand drawn 2D animation, stop-motion, as well as live-action.

Biography 
Ginsburg grew up in Kentish Town and attended Camberwell College of Arts for her foundation degree and the Edinburgh College of Art where she studied animation, and graduated in 2012. She is frequently collaborating with illustrators and artists, such as Sara Andreasson, Caitlin McCarthy and Melissa Kitty Jarram.

Ginsburg has worked on many independent animated films that have received awards, including a music video, How Can You Swallow So Much Sleep?, that won a BAFTA at the National Talent Awards. She has also received an ADC Young Guns award, as well as a British Arrows award for her work on Material World.

Filmography 
 Private Parts (2016) 
 Selfridges and Sustainability (2017) 
 Material World (2017)
 Ugly (2019)

References

External links 
 Anna Ginsburg on Vimeo

Living people
English animators
British animators
British women animators
British animated film directors
British film directors
British women film directors
BAFTA winners (people)
Alumni of Camberwell College of Arts
Alumni of the Edinburgh College of Art
Year of birth missing (living people)